Major General Andre Walker Brewster (December 9, 1862 – March 27, 1942) was a United States Army officer and a recipient of the Medal of Honor. He served in several high-profile assignments throughout his long military career, including Inspector General of the United States Army and Inspector General of the American Expeditionary Forces (AEF) in France during World War I. In addition, he was a veteran of the American Indian Wars, the Spanish–American War, the Philippine–American War, and Boxer Rebellion. He received the Medal of Honor for his role in the Battle of Tientsin during the Boxer Rebellion.

Early life
Andre Walker Brewster was born on December 9, 1862, in Hoboken, New Jersey. His mother was Mary Bache Walker (1839-1876), great-great-great granddaughter of Benjamin Franklin, daughter of Robert J. Walker, and sister of Duncan Stephen Walker.  His father was Adrien Deslondes (also spelled Deslonde or Deslandes, etc.), a midshipman in the United States Navy whose family owned sugar plantations in Louisiana.

Adrien Deslondes and Mary Walker divorced in the mid 1860s.  In 1870, Mary Walker married Benjamin H. Brewster, who adopted Andre Walker Deslondes and his siblings.  Andre Brewster was raised and educated in Philadelphia and Washington, D.C. He was trained as an attorney and practiced for three years before joining the Army.

Start of career
In January 1885, Brewster received a direct commission as a second lieutenant in the 10th Infantry Regiment, a post which had also been sought by David L. Brainard. He served on frontier duty, including campaigns against the Apache and Sioux during the American Indian Wars.

During the Spanish–American War, Brewster commanded Company B, 9th Infantry. He took part in the Siege of Santiago and the Battle of San Juan Hill. He was recommended for brevet promotion to captain for his conduct at San Juan Hill. Following his service in Cuba, Brewster continued to command Company B during the Philippine Insurrection.

Medal of Honor action
For his actions during the Boxer Rebellion on July 13, 1900, in Tientsin, China, Brewster was awarded the Medal of Honor.

Medal of Honor citation

Citation:
The President of the United States of America, in the name of Congress, takes pleasure in presenting the Medal of Honor to Captain (Infantry) Andre Walker Brewster, United States Army, for gallantry in action on 13 July 1900, while serving with the 9th Infantry at Tientsin, China. While under fire Captain Brewster rescued two of his men from drowning.

Continued career
Brewster remained in China for five years as the U.S. military attaché. He then attended the Army War College, from which he graduated in 1907. In early 1909, he was appointed acting inspector general of the Army.  The appointment was confirmed in December, and he held the post until 1913.

In 1914, Brewster was assigned to Puerto Rico as commander of the 65th Infantry Regiment.  He then returned to the inspector general's post, where he remained until 1917.

World War I

During World War I, from June 1917 to September 1919, he served in France as Inspector General of General Headquarters, American Expeditionary Forces (AEF). AEF commander John J. Pershing valued Brewster's judgment, especially with respect to evaluating the performance of brigade and division commanders. When Brewster assessed the combat performance of Robert Houston Noble, commander of the 158th Infantry Brigade, as ineffective, Pershing relieved Noble. Brewster's negative assessment of Omar Bundy's performance as commander of the 2nd Division was a key factor in his removal from command and transfer to command of the skeletal U.S. VI Corps. His positive appraisal of Robert Lee Bullard's performance was a major factor in Pershing's decision to recommend Bullard for promotion to lieutenant general and assignment as commander of Second United States Army. Pershing had a less than favorable view of Clarence Ransom Edwards, commander of the 26th Division, and Brewster's lengthy assessment of Edwards as a subpar performer played a role in Pershing's decision to relieve Edwards.

Army Distinguished Service Medal citation
Citation:
The President of the United States of America, authorized by Act of Congress, July 9, 1918, takes pleasure in presenting the Distinguished Service Medal to Major General Andre Walker Brewster, United States Army, for exceptionally meritorious and distinguished services to the Government of the United States, in a duty of great responsibility during World War I. General Brewster organized and administered with marked ability the Inspector General's Department of the American Expeditionary Forces, and his soldierly characteristics and unceasing labors influenced greatly the attainment of efficiency in the American Army in France.

War Department, General Orders No. 12 (1919)

Later career

From 1921 to 1922, Brewster commanded the Second Coast Artillery District, headquartered at Fort Totten, New York. Brewster's final command was the First Corps Area in Boston, Massachusetts, where he succeeded Clarence Ransom Edwards. He retired in 1925 with the rank of major general.

Death and burial
Brewster died in Boston on March 27, 1942. He was buried at Arlington National Cemetery.

Family
In 1885, Brewster married Elizabeth Griffin (1862–1948). They were the parents of a daughter, Mary Walker Brewster (1887–1979), the wife of James Donald Cassels.

Namesakes
In World War II, the United States Navy transport ship  was named in Brewster's honor. The ship was also active in the Korean War, earning five battle stars for her service in that conflict.

Honors and awards
Brewster's awards included:

Dates of rank
 Second Lieutenant – 19 January 1885
 First Lieutenant – 17 December 1891
 Captain, Assistant Quartermaster, Volunteers – 15 October 1898
 Captain – 2 March 1899
 Discharged from Volunteers – 12 May 1899
 Major – 15 March 1908
 Lieutenant Colonel – 2 December 1913
 Colonel – 1 July 1916
 Brigadier General, National Army – 5 August 1917
 Major General, National Army – 28 November 1917
 Brigadier General, Regular Army – 8 January 1920
 Discharged from National Army – 28 February 1920
 Major General, Regular Army – 1 December 1922
 Major General, Retired List – 9 December 1925

See also

 List of Medal of Honor recipients for the Boxer Rebellion

Notes

References

External links

 This article includes text in the public domain from the U.S. Government.

1862 births
1942 deaths
United States Army personnel of the Indian Wars
United States Army Infantry Branch personnel
United States Army Medal of Honor recipients
People from Hoboken, New Jersey
American military personnel of the Spanish–American War
Burials at Arlington National Cemetery
American military personnel of the Boxer Rebellion
Boxer Rebellion recipients of the Medal of Honor
United States Army generals of World War I
United States Army generals
United States Army War College alumni
United States military attachés
Military personnel from New Jersey